The 2014–15 season is the 66th season of competitive football in Pakistan.

Changes in the Premier League

Teams promoted to the 2014–15 Pakistan Premier League:
 Pakistan Railways

Teams relegated from the 2014–15 Pakistan Premier League:
 Habib Bank
 Lyallpur
 Navy
 Pak Afghan Clearing
 Zarai Taraqiati

Name changes:
 Karachi Electric Supply Corporation F.C. → K-Electric F.C.

Internationals

Men

International Friendlies

2018 FIFA World Cup qualifier

Club competitions

Pakistan Premier League

Pakistan Football Federation League

Play-off finals

Notes

References